Sidney Sterling Woods (25 July 1917 – 31 March 1989) was an American fighter ace of World War II with 7 victories in Europe and the Pacific theater.

Early years
Sidney Woods was born in San Marcos, Texas on July 25, 1917. He spent much of his youth in Arizona.  He played quarterback for the University of Arizona from 1935 to 1939, and graduated in 1939.

Military service

U.S. Army Cavalry
Second Lieutenant Woods served the next two years (1939–1940) as a cavalryman at Fort Bliss. He was accepted for flight training and graduated from pilot school in September 1941. As a member of the U.S. Army Air Forces, he was flying with the 49th Pursuit Group at the time of the
Japanese attack on Pearl Harbor.

World War II flying ace
In 1942 and 1943, while based in Australia and the Southwest Pacific he flew Lockheed P-38 Lightnings and shot down two enemy aircraft in 112 combat missions. He returned to the U.S. in 1943.

Woods spent six months commanding a P-38 training squadron before he was sent to Europe as a P-38 pilot with a new unit.  He completed his first tour in Europe in late 1944. Subsequently, he returned to the European Theater of Operations (ETO) for another combat tour, flying P-51 Mustangs with the 4th Fighter Group. As deputy group commander, Lt. Col. Woods became an ace in a day by downing five Focke-Wulf 190s on 22 March 1945. However, three weeks later he was shot down by flak over Prague, Czechoslovakia, on his 68th ETO mission when he was leading Group "A" in a strafing attack against the Luftwaffe bases in the area.  He spent the remainder of the war as a prisoner of war.  He was released from captivity about two months later.  He was discharged in 1945, returning to Arizona.

Korean War
During the Korean War he was called to active duty (1951–1952) to command a training unit at Williams Air Force Base.  He also led the Air Force Jet Acrobatic Team, the predecessor to the Air Force's Thunderbirds.

Decorations
Colonel Woods' decorations included the Army Distinguished Service Cross, Silver Star, three Distinguished Flying Crosses, ten Air Medals, and the French Croix de guerre.

  Distinguished Service Cross
  Silver Star
  Distinguished Flying Cross with two oak leaf clusters
  Air Medal with one silver oak leaf cluster and four bronze oak leaf clusters
  French Croix de Guerre

Civilian career
Woods settled in Arizona after World War II, becoming a successful Yuma businessman, flying his own aircraft, and as a founding member of the American Fighter Aces Association.

He was a delegate to the Republican National Convention in 1964.

Sid Woods died of cancer at age 71 and his alma mater established an alumni service award in his honor.

External links
 4th Fighter Group Association WWII
Fighter Pilot Aces List.
Woods' combat report for 22 March 1945

1917 births
1989 deaths
American World War II flying aces
Arizona Wildcats football players
Aviators from Texas
People from San Marcos, Texas
Recipients of the Distinguished Service Cross (United States)
Recipients of the Silver Star
Recipients of the Distinguished Flying Cross (United States)
Recipients of the Croix de Guerre 1939–1945 (France)
Recipients of the Air Medal
United States Air Force officers
United States Army Air Forces officers
United States Army Air Forces pilots of World War II
United States Army officers
World War II prisoners of war held by Germany
Military personnel from Texas